The 1990 World Women's Handball Championship took place in South Korea between 24 November to 4 December 1990. It was the first World Championship not played in a European country. The championship was held after the German reunification, although East and West Germany participated separately.

Qualification 
Host nation
 

Qualified from the 1988 Summer Olympics
 
 
 

Qualified from the 1989 World Championship B
 
 
 
 
 
 
 
 
 

Qualified from the 1989 Asian Women's Handball Championship
 

Qualified from the 1989 Pan American Women's Handball Championship
 

Qualified from the 1989 African Women's Handball Championship

Main round

Group 1

Results 

 * Results carried over from Preliminary Round

Group 2

Results 

+ Results carried over from Preliminary Round

Finals

Final standings

References 

Source: International Handball Federation

External links 
 Official report

World Handball Championship tournaments
World Women's Handball Championship, 1990
World Women's Handball Championship, 1990
H
Women's handball in South Korea
November 1990 sports events in Asia
December 1990 sports events in Asia